Echemoides is a genus of South American ground spiders that was first described by Cândido Firmino de Mello-Leitão in 1938. Originally placed with the ant spiders, it was moved to the ground spiders in 1993.

Species
 it contains fifteen species:
Echemoides aguilari Platnick & Shadab, 1979 – Peru
Echemoides argentinus (Mello-Leitão, 1940) – Argentina
Echemoides balsa Platnick & Shadab, 1979 – Argentina
Echemoides cekalovici Platnick, 1983 – Chile
Echemoides chilensis Platnick, 1983 – Chile
Echemoides gayi (Simon, 1904) – Chile
Echemoides giganteus Mello-Leitão, 1938 (type) – Argentina
Echemoides illapel Platnick & Shadab, 1979 – Chile
Echemoides malleco Platnick & Shadab, 1979 – Chile
Echemoides mauryi Platnick & Shadab, 1979 – Paraguay, Argentina
Echemoides penai Platnick & Shadab, 1979 – Peru, Chile
Echemoides penicillatus (Mello-Leitão, 1942) – Paraguay, Argentina
Echemoides rossi Platnick & Shadab, 1979 – Chile
Echemoides schlingeri Platnick & Shadab, 1979 – Chile
Echemoides tofo Platnick & Shadab, 1979 – Chile

References

Araneomorphae genera
Gnaphosidae
Spiders of South America
Taxa named by Cândido Firmino de Mello-Leitão